Theodore Gronert (July 28, 1886 – February 3, 1966) was a college basketball coach and history professor. He was a veteran of World War I. He coached Bo McMillin and Edgar Diddle at Centre College in basketball. He was chairman of the Wabash College history department, and considered an authority on American and Russian history. He also taught at the University of Arkansas.

References

Centre Colonels men's basketball coaches
1886 births
1966 deaths
People from Wisconsin
Wabash College faculty